Karel Krejčí (born 20 December 1968) is a Czech football manager and former player who was the manager of Czech Republic U-21.  He was born in Plzeň.

Playing career
Krejčí played in the Czech First League in the 1990s, representing FC Svit Zlín, 1. FK Příbram and SK České Budějovice. His last First League match was three minutes in a 7–0 loss to Sparta Prague.

Management career
Following his career as a player, Krejčí became coach of Příbram reserve football team. 
Krejčí joined Czech First League side Plzeň as manager in April 2008 for the end of the 2007-08 Gambrinus liga after Levý´s departure. In new season he became assistant of new head coach Jaroslav Šilhavý and later Pavel Vrba. This coach duo Vrba-Krejčí started in Plzeň very successful era, in which the club won two league titles, one cup title, and three consecutive seasons of participation in the UEFA Europa League knockout stage. When in December 2013 Vrba joined the Czech Republic national football team as head coach, Krejčí continued to work with him as his first assistant. 
In August 2015, Krejčí was named as the new manager of Viktoria Plzeň after Miroslav Koubek´s departure because of unsuccessful start of new season.

Honours

Managerial 
 FC Viktoria Plzeň
Czech First League: 2015–16

Managerial statistics

References

1968 births
Living people
Sportspeople from Plzeň
Czech footballers
Czechoslovak footballers
Czech First League players
FC Viktoria Plzeň players
FC Fastav Zlín players
1. FK Příbram players
SK Dynamo České Budějovice players
Czech football managers
Czech First League managers
FC Viktoria Plzeň managers
Association footballers not categorized by position
FK Dukla Prague players